John Berry Clacy (1810–80) was a Victorian architect whose practice was centred on Reading and Wokingham in the English county of Berkshire.

Family
John's paternal grandfather and his ancestors were long resident around Barkham in Berkshire. John was brother-in-law of the Australian travel writer, Ellen Clacy.

Career
Most of Clacy's significant works are Gothic Revival buildings, but the Corn Exchange in Reading that he designed with F. Hawkes is in a style that Nikolaus Pevsner described as "free, debased Renaissance". Clacy's son had joined him in his practice by 1862. In 1868 Clacy and Son's practice was recorded as being in Reading.

Work
St. Mary's parish church, Burghfield, Berkshire, 1843
King Alfred's Grammar School, Wantage, Berkshire (now Oxfordshire), 1849–50
Corn Exchange, Reading, 1854 (with F. Hawkes)
St. Helen's parish church, Dry Sandford, Oxfordshire, 1855
Holy Trinity and All Saints parish church, Hawley, Hampshire: extensions, 1857
St. Andrew's parish church, South Stoke, Oxfordshire: restoration and extensions, 1857
St. James' parish church, Barkham, Berkshire, 1860–62 (with his son)

References

Sources

1810 births
1880 deaths
People from Reading, Berkshire
19th-century English architects
Gothic Revival architects
English ecclesiastical architects
Architects from Berkshire